A curry is a dish with a sauce seasoned with spices, mainly associated with South Asian cuisine. In southern India, leaves from the curry tree may be included.

There are many varieties of curry. The choice of spices for each dish in traditional cuisine depends on regional cultural tradition and personal preferences. Such dishes have names that refer to their ingredients, spicing, and cooking methods. Outside the Indian subcontinent, a curry is a dish from Southeast Asia which uses coconut milk or spice pastes, commonly eaten over rice. Curries may contain fish, meat, poultry, or shellfish, either alone or in combination with vegetables. Others are vegetarian. Dry curries are cooked using small amounts of liquid, which is allowed to evaporate, leaving the other ingredients coated with the spice mixture. Wet curries contain significant amounts of sauce or gravy based on broth, coconut cream or coconut milk, dairy cream or yogurt, or legume purée, sautéed crushed onion, or tomato purée.

Curry powder, a commercially prepared mixture of spices marketed in the West, was first exported to Britain in the 18th century when Indian merchants sold a concoction of spices, similar to garam masala, to the British colonial government and army returning to Britain.

Etymology

Curry is an anglicised form of the Tamil   meaning 'sauce' or 'relish for rice' that uses the leaves of the curry tree (Murraya koenigii). The word kari is also used in other Dravidian languages, namely in Malayalam, Kannada and Kodava with the meaning of "vegetables (or meat) of any kind (raw or boiled), curry". Kaṟi is described in a mid-17th century Portuguese cookbook by members of the British East India Company, who were trading with Tamil merchants along the Coromandel Coast of southeast India, becoming known as a "spice blend ... called kari podi or curry powder". The first appearance in its anglicised form (spelled currey) was in Hannah Glasse's 1747 book The Art of Cookery Made Plain and Easy.

The word cury in the 1390s English cookbook, The Forme of Cury, is unrelated, coming from the Middle French word cuire, meaning 'to cook'.

History
Archaeological evidence dating to 2600 BCE from Mohenjo-daro suggests the use of mortar and pestle to pound spices including mustard, fennel, cumin, and tamarind pods with which they flavoured food. Black pepper is native to the Indian subcontinent and Southeast Asia and has been known to Indian cooking since at least 2000 BCE.

The three basic ingredients of the spicy stew were ginger, garlic and turmeric. Using a method called "starch grain analysis", archaeologists at the University of Washington at Vancouver were able to identify the residue of these ancient spices in both skeletons and pottery shards from excavations in India. Examining the human teeth and the residue from the cooking pots, signs of turmeric and ginger were evident.

The establishment of the Mughal Empire, in the early 15th century, also influenced some curries, especially in the north. Another influence was the establishment of the Portuguese trading centre in Goa in 1510, resulting in the introduction of chili pepper, tomatoes and potatoes to India from the Americas, as a byproduct of the Columbian Exchange.

The British lumped all sauce-based dishes under the generic name 'curry'. It was introduced to English cuisine from Anglo-Indian cooking in the 17th century, as spicy sauces were added to plain boiled and cooked meats. Curry was first served in coffee houses in Britain from 1809, and has been increasingly popular in Great Britain, with major jumps in the 1940s and the 1970s. During the 19th century, curry was carried to the Caribbean by Indian indentured workers in the British sugar industry. Since the mid-20th century, curries of many national styles have become popular far from their origins, and increasingly become part of international fusion cuisine.

By region

South Asia

India is the home of curry, and many Indian dishes are curry-based, prepared by adding different types of vegetables, lentils, or meats. The content of the curry and style of preparation vary by region. Most curries are water-based, with occasional use of dairy and coconut milk. Curry dishes are usually thick and spicy and are eaten along with steamed rice and a variety of Indian breads. The popular rogan josh, for example, from Kashmiri cuisine, is a wet curry of lamb with a red gravy coloured by Kashmiri chillies and an extract of the red flowers of the cockscomb plant (mawal). Goshtaba (large lamb meatballs cooked in yoghurt gravy) is another curry dish from the Wazwan tradition occasionally found in Western restaurants.

Curries in Bengali cuisine include seafood and fresh fish. Mustard seeds and mustard oil are added to many recipes, as are poppy seeds. Emigrants from the Sylhet district of Bangladesh founded the curry house industry in Britain, while in Sylhet some restaurants run by expatriates specialise in British-style Indian food.

East Asia
Curry spread to other regions of Asia. Although not an integral part of Chinese cuisine, curry powder is added to some dishes in the southern part of China. The curry powder sold in Chinese grocery stores is similar to Madras curry powder but with addition of star anise and cinnamon. The former Portuguese colony of Macau has its own culinary traditions and curry dishes, including Galinha à portuguesa and curry crab. Portuguese sauce is a sauce flavoured with curry and thickened with coconut milk.

Japanese curry is usually eaten as  – curry, rice, and often pickled vegetables, served on the same plate and eaten with a spoon, a common lunchtime canteen dish. It is less spicy and seasoned than Indian and Southeast Asian curries, being more of a thick stew than a curry. British people brought curry from the Indian colony back to Britain and introduced it to Japan during the Meiji period (1868 to 1912), after Japan ended its policy of national self-isolation, and curry in Japan was categorised as a Western dish. Its spread across the country is attributed to its use in the Japanese Army and Navy which adopted it extensively as convenient field and naval canteen cooking, allowing even conscripts from the remotest countryside to experience the dish. The Japan Maritime Self-Defense Force traditionally have curry every Friday for lunch and many ships have their own recipes. The standard Japanese curry contains onions, carrots, potatoes, and sometimes celery, and a meat that is cooked in a large pot. Sometimes grated apples or honey are added for additional sweetness and other vegetables are sometimes used instead.

Curry was popularized in Korean cuisine when Ottogi entered the Korean food industry with a curry powder in 1969. Korean curry, usually served with rice, is characterized by the golden yellow colour of turmeric. Curry tteokbokki is made of tteok (rice cakes), eomuk (fish cakes), eggs, vegetables, and curry. Curry can be added to Korean dishes such as bokkeumbap (fried rice), sundubujjigae (silken tofu stew), fried chicken, vegetable stir-fries, and salads.

Southeast Asia
Malaysian cuisine may have initially incorporated curries via the Indian population, but it has become a staple among the Malay and Chinese populations there. Malaysian curries typically use turmeric-rich curry powders, coconut milk, shallots, ginger, belacan (shrimp paste), chili peppers, and garlic. Tamarind is also often used. Rendang, which is originated from Minang, is drier and contains mostly meat and more coconut milk than a conventional Malaysian curry; it was mentioned in Malay literature in the 1550s by Hikayat Amir Hamzah.

In Burmese cuisine, curries are broadly called hin. Burmese curries generally consist of protein that is simmered in a curry base of aromatics including shallots, onions, ginger, and garlic, alongside dried spices like turmeric, paprika, and garam masala. Burmese curries generally differ from other Southeast Asian curries in that dried spices are also used commonly to season the dishes, while coconut milk is only used sparingly for select dishes.

In the Philippines, two kinds of curry traditions are seen corresponding with the cultural divide between the Hispanicised north and Indianised/Islamised south. In the northern areas, a linear range of new curry recipes could be seen. The most common is a variant of the native  (chicken cooked in coconut milk) dish with the addition of curry powder, known as the "Filipino chicken curry". This is the usual curry dish that northern Filipinos are familiar with.

In Thai cuisine, curries are called , and usually consist of meat, fish or vegetables in a sauce based on a paste made from chilies, onions or shallots, garlic, and shrimp paste. Additional spices and herbs define the type of curry. Local ingredients, such as chili peppers, kaffir lime leaves, lemongrass, galangal are used and, in central and southern Thai cuisine, coconut milk. Northern and northeastern Thai curries generally do not contain coconut milk. Due to the use of sugar and coconut milk, Thai curries tend to be sweeter than Indian curries. In the West, some of the Thai curries are described by colour; red curries use red chilies while green curries use green chilies. Yellow curry—called  (by various spellings) in Thai, of which a literal translation could be "curry soup"—is more similar to Indian curries, with the use of turmeric, cumin, and other dried spices. A few stir-fried Thai dishes also use an Indian style curry powder.

Africa

Consumption of curry spread to South Africa with the migration of people from the Indian subcontinent to the region in the colonial era. African curries, Cape Malay curries and Natal curries include the traditional Natal curry, the Durban curry, bunny chow, and roti rolls. South African curries appear to have been founded in both KwaZulu-Natal and the Western Cape, while other curries developed across the country over the late 20th century and early 21st century to include ekasi, coloured, and Afrikaner curries. Durban has the largest population of Indians outside of India in the world. Bunny chow or a "set", a South African standard, consists of either lamb, chicken or bean curry poured into a tunnelled-out loaf of bread to be eaten with one's fingers by dipping pieces of the bread into it.

Europe

Curry is very popular in the United Kingdom, with a curry house in nearly every town. Such is the popularity of curry in the United Kingdom, it has frequently been called its "adopted national dish". It was estimated that in 2016 there were 12,000 curry houses, employing 100,000 people and with annual combined sales of approximately £4.2 billion.

The food offered is Indian food cooked to British taste, but with increasing demand for authentic Indian styles. As of 2015, curry houses accounted for a fifth of the restaurant business in the U.K. but, being historically a low wage sector, they were plagued by a shortage of labour. Established Indian immigrants from South Asia were moving on to other occupations; there were difficulties in training Europeans to cook curry; and immigration restrictions, which require payment of a high wage to skilled immigrants, had crimped the supply of new cooks.

Curry powder

"Curry powder", as available in certain western markets, is a commercial spice blend, and first sold by Indian merchants to European colonial traders. This resulted in the export of a derived version of Indian concoction of spices. and commercially available from the late 18th century, with brands such as Crosse & Blackwell and Sharwood's persisting to the present. British traders introduced the powder to Meiji Japan, in the mid-19th century, where it became known as Japanese curry.

See also
 Curry Awards
 The British Curry Awards
 The Curry Club

Gallery

References

Further reading
 Chapman, Pat. Curry Club Indian Restaurant Cookbook. London – Piatkus. &  (1984 to 2009)
 Chapman, Pat. The Little Curry Book. London – Piatkus.  (1985)
 Achaya, K.T. A Historical Dictionary of Indian Food. Delhi, Oxford University Press (1998)
 Achaya, K.T. A Historical Dictionary of Indian Food. Delhi, Oxford University Press (1998)
 Grove, Peter & Colleen. The Flavours of History. London, Godiva Books (2011)
 Chapman, Pat. India: Food & Cooking. London, New Holland –  (2007)
 Indian Food: A Historical Companion. Delhi, Oxford University Press, 1994
 David Burton. The Raj at Table.  London, Faber and Faber (1993)
 Pat Chapman's Curry Bible. Hodder & St –  &   &  &  (1997)
 New Curry Bible, An unaltered edition of Pat Chapman's Curry Bible published by John Blake Publishers.  (2005)
 E.M. Collingham. Curry: A Biography. London, Chatto & Windus, 2005
 An Invitation to Indian Cooking. London, Penguin, 1975
 Jaffrey, Madhur. Various books on curry from 1973 to 2015.
 Chapman, Pat. Petit Plats Curry. Paris. Hachette Marabout.  (2000)

Afghan cuisine
Belizean cuisine
Bengali cuisine
Bhutanese cuisine
British cuisine
Burmese cuisine
Chili pepper dishes
Chinese cuisine
Fijian cuisine
Guyanese cuisine
Indian cuisine
Indonesian cuisine
Jamaican cuisine
Japanese cuisine
Kashmiri cuisine
Korean cuisine
Malaysian cuisine
Maldivian cuisine
Nepalese cuisine
Omani cuisine
Pakistani cuisine
Philippine cuisine
South African cuisine
South Asian cuisine
Sri Lankan cuisine
Thai cuisine
Trinidad and Tobago cuisine
Vietnamese cuisine